Actif was Citoyen class 74-gun ship of the line of the French Navy.

Career 
Actif was built partly with timber recycled from Actif, a 64-gun ship.

She took part in the Battle of Ushant on 27 July 1778 under Estienne d'Orves. The year after, she was in the Channel as part of Orvilliers's squadron, but she suffered an epidemic that disabled 222 of her crew, and was forced to return to Brest.

In 1780, she was under La Cardonnie, and cruised off Cadiz and Saint-Vincent. She captured the British Hercule, Wright, master, off Saint-Vincent.

On 14 and 15 April 1781, as she was cruising under Brun de Boades, Actif fought an action against the 64-gun HMS Nonsuch.

In February 1782, she cruised off England under Allart de Suville.

Fate 
Actif was sold in 1784.

Notes, citations, and references 
Notes

Citations

Bibliography
 
 
 

External links
 
 

Ships of the line of the French Navy
Citoyen-class ships of the line
1767 ships